Pascal Fabre (born 9 January 1960) is a former racing driver from France. He participated in 14 Formula One Grands Prix with the uncompetitive AGS team, debuting on 12 April 1987. He scored no championship points and was replaced before the end of the season by Roberto Moreno. His best finish was ninth place in both the French and British Grands Prix.

He later raced for Courage Compétition from 1988 to 1990 in the World Sportscar Championship and made short-term appearances for various other sports car teams throughout the 1990s.

Racing record

24 Hours of Le Mans results

Complete Formula One results
(key)

References

External links
Profile at grandprix.com
Profile at Driver database

1960 births
Living people
Sportspeople from Lyon
French racing drivers
French Formula One drivers
AGS Formula One drivers
European Formula Two Championship drivers
International Formula 3000 drivers
24 Hours of Le Mans drivers
World Sportscar Championship drivers
24 Hours of Spa drivers
20th-century French people
21st-century French people